Wagner Sousa Gomes, also known as Capitão Wagner (born January 21, 1979) is a captain of the Military Police Reserve of the State of Ceará and a Brazilian politician affiliated to Brazil Union (UNIÃO). He was a federal deputy in office from 2019 to 2023.

Leader of Ceará's public security workers, he was notable for leading the 2011 Ceará Military Police riot, which was responsible for the insecurity among the population and the chaos brought to the city of Fortaleza with a forced quarantine. At the time, he exchanged insults with the then governor Cid Gomes and his brother Ciro Gomes. 

He was the most voted councillor of Fortaleza in 2012, the most voted state deputy in Ceará in 2014 and the most voted federal deputy in Ceará in 2018. He was also a candidate for mayor in the 2016 Fortaleza mayoral election and 2020 Fortaleza mayoral election and in both disputes, he advanced to a second round. But in the end, Mayor Roberto Cláudio (in 2016) and José Sarto (in 2020), both members of the Democratic Labour Party (PDT) were elected. 

He's currently the Secretary of Health of Maracanaú under Roberto Pessoa's administration.

Career 
Wagner Sousa Gomes was born in São Paulo, in the district of Santo Amaro, and as a child he moved to Fortaleza. In 2009, he was approved in a Federal Highway Police (PRF) test. After he took the position of Bachelor in Public Security, Wagner was the leader of the strike movement of the Military Police and Firefighters in Ceará, from the end of 2011 to 2012. 

In 2009, he joined the Party of the Republic (PR). He ran in 2010 for State Deputy of Ceará, having obtained 28,818 votes, being Fernanda Pessoa's substitute. He took office in September 2011, when he went to the proportional paid reserve of the Military Police of Ceará, due to the deputy's retirement. He participated in the electoral race for councillor in Fortaleza in 2012, being elected with the highest number of votes in the city.  In 2014, he ran for state deputy and was again elected with the highest number of votes. In an interview with Rádio Clube, on March 16, 2016, he announced his candidacy for mayor of Fortaleza, which had the support of the Brazilian Social Democracy Party (PSDB), of the Brazilian Democratic Movement Party (PMDB) and Solidariedade (SD). 

In August 2016, at an event of his campaign in the João XXIII neighborhood of Fortaleza, he assured that his first proposal was to arm and train the Municipal Guard of Fortaleza. However, he received criticism from his opponent, Luizianne Lins (PT), stating that it would be “a thing for desperate people”.

In the 2016 Fortaleza mayoral election, Capitão Wagner obtained 400,802 votes (31.15%), which lead the dispute for the mayor of Fortaleza to a second round with Roberto Cláudio (PDT). He was defeated in the second round, obtaining 588,451 votes (46.43%) against Roberto Cláudio's 678,847 votes (53.57%). 

In 2018, Capitão Wagner joined the Republican Party of the Social Order (PROS) and decided to run in the state elections in Ceará as a candidate for the Chamber of Deputies. He ended up being the most voted candidate for federal deputy in the state, with over 300,000 votes.

Accused of leading the 2020 police riot in Ceará, Wagner presented a bill in the Chamber of Deputies to give amnesty to security agents involved in the strike. The project was rejected by the president of the Chamber of the Deputies at the time, Rodrigo Maia. 

In the 2020 Fortaleza mayoral election, Capitão Wagner was a candidate for mayor for a second time. In the second round, he got 624,892 votes (48.31%), being defeated by José Sarto (PDT), who got 668,652 votes (51.69%).

In the 2022 Ceará gubernatorial election, Capitão Wagner was a candidate for governor for the first time. He got 1,649,213 votes (31.72%) and was defeated in the first round by Elmano de Freitas (PT), elected with almost 3 million votes.

In 2 February 2023, he was appointed by the Mayor of Maracanaú, Roberto Pessoa (UNIÃO), as the new Secretary of Health of the municipality.

Electoral history

References 

1979 births
Living people
Members of the Chamber of Deputies (Brazil) from Ceará
Members of the Legislative Assembly of Ceará
Brazil Union politicians
Republican Party of the Social Order politicians
Liberal Party (Brazil, 2006) politicians